Michel Maurice Daniel Denisot (born 16 April 1945) is a French journalist, producer, television host and director of a football club. As of April 2021, Denisot is president of LB Châteauroux.

Early years 
At 15 Denisot began his career of journalist as a correspondent in the local press in Châteauroux. From 1968, he worked on the regional station of the ORTF of Limoges. He worked for stations in Poitiers, Bordeaux and Reims.

From 1969, he worked on the gameshow Le Schmilblic, produced and presented by Guy Lux.

1972–1984 : journalist on TF1 
In 1972, he left Berry for Paris. He integrated the first of ORTF (before TF1). He fetched coffee or orange juice for Jean Lanzi and Jean-Pierre Elkabbach.

In 1973, he worked at the third of ORTF (before FR3 and France 3) before returning to TF1 in 1975 to co-host Journal télévisé de 13 heures with Yves Mourousi and Claude Pierrard for 2 and a half years.

In 1977, he integrated the sport division of TF1. From 1981 he hosted Téléfoot with Thierry Roland and was a football commentator.

Awards 
In November 1998, he became a Chevalier of the Légion d'honneur, for his actions on Paris Saint-Germain F.C.

Filmography 
 2009 : Incognito, directed by Éric Lavaine

Honours 
Orders
Chevalier of the Légion d'honneur: 1998

See also 
 Le Grand Journal
 Canal+

References 

1945 births
Living people
French male journalists
French television journalists
French television presenters
French television producers
People from Indre
Chevaliers of the Légion d'honneur
Paris Saint-Germain F.C. presidents
French football chairmen and investors